The 1964 Formula One season was the 18th season of FIA Formula One motor racing. It included the 1964 World Championship of Drivers, won by John Surtees; and the 1964 International Cup for F1 Manufacturers, won by Ferrari – both of which were contested concurrently over a series which commenced on 10 May and ended on 25 October after ten races. The season also included eight non-championship races for Formula One cars.

Season summary
The World Championship of Drivers, fiercely contested by Jim Clark, John Surtees and Graham Hill, was decided at the Mexican Grand Prix when Hill was delayed after a collision with Lorenzo Bandini's Ferrari. Clark was forced to stop with an oil leak on the last lap, and Ferrari signalled Bandini to let Surtees through into the second place which gave him the championship by one point from Hill. A Ferrari 158 car officially entered by the American privateer team NART sealed the win of the championship with Surtees, as the works team competed the last two races (the United States Grand Prix and Mexican Grand Prix) in cars painted white and blue – the national colours of the United States. This was done as a protest concerning arguments between Ferrari and the Italian motorsport body ACI regarding the homologation of a new mid-engined Ferrari Le Mans race car. Ferrari won the International Cup for F1 Manufacturers. Honda made a low-key debut in Grand Prix racing with the American driver Ronnie Bucknum, and Maurice Trintignant retired at the age of 46 after one of the longest world championship careers. He was the last active driver to have competed in the first World Championship season in 1950.

Dutchman Carel Godin de Beaufort died during practice for the German Grand Prix at the Nürburgring, driving a privately entered Porsche 718.

Teams and drivers
The following teams and drivers competed in the 1964 FIA World Championship.

Calendar

The South African Grand Prix at the Prince George Circuit was scheduled for 26 December but was cancelled and run a week later to be the season opener of the 1965 Formula One season.

Results and standings

Grands Prix

World Drivers' Championship standings

Championship points were awarded on a 9–6–4–3–2–1 basis for the first six positions in each race. Only the best 6 results counted toward the championship. Hill scored 41 points during the year, but only 39 points were counted toward the championship. Surtees scored 40 points, all of which counted toward the championship. Thus, Surtees became the World Champion, although he did not score the most points over the course of the year.

International Cup for F1 Manufacturers standings
Points were awarded on a 9–6–4–3–2–1 basis for the first six positions at each round with only the best six round results retained. Only the best placed car from each manufacturer at each round was eligible to score points.

Non-championship races
Eight other races which did not count towards the World Championship of Drivers and the International Cup for F1 Manufacturers were held for Formula One cars during the season.

References

Formula One seasons